Caloptilia honoratella is a moth of the family Gracillariidae. It is known from Austria, Hungary, Iberia, Italy, the Netherlands and North Macedonia. The first British record, found in Cheriton, Kent was confirmed by examining the genitalia in April 2019.

References

honoratella
Moths described in 1914
Moths of Europe
Taxa named by Hans Rebel